The Ames company, originally established in 1881 by Frederick A. Ames, was a buggy manufacturer and later an American automobile manufacturer in Owensboro, Kentucky, from 1910 to 1925. A beetle-backed "gentleman's roadster" and a five-passenger tourer were the first models offered for sale by the company. The company also produced replacement bodies for the Ford Model T. At its peak, the company produced about 30,000 vehicles. The last model the company made was called the "Kentucky Thoroughbred". In 1922, the company again remade itself, manufacturing furniture under the name F. A. Ames Corporation until 1941, when the company filed for bankruptcy and most of its assets were purchased by the Whitehall Furniture Co. of Owensboro.{{ Coachbuilt Page on the Ames}}

Frederick A. Ames died in 1925 at the age of 60. At the time of his death, he was reported to have vast real-estate holdings in Owensboro and Atlanta, Georgia. His widow, the former Mary M. McMannon, died in 1933. Although the Ames had no children of their own, Mary's niece, Marie had been raised in their home as an adopted child, and inherited most of Ames' fortune.

References

Further reading
 Owensboro-Daviess County, KY Museum of Natural Science and History

Brass Era vehicles
Defunct motor vehicle manufacturers of the United States
Owensboro, Kentucky
1881 establishments in Kentucky
Defunct manufacturing companies based in Kentucky